The 1979–80 Yugoslav Cup was the 32nd season of the top football knockout competition in SFR Yugoslavia, the Yugoslav Cup, also known as the "Marshal Tito Cup" (Kup Maršala Tita), since its establishment in 1946.

Calendar
The Yugoslav Cup was a tournament for which clubs from all tiers of the football pyramid were eligible to enter. In addition, amateur teams put together by individual Yugoslav People's Army garrisons and various factories and industrial plants were also encouraged to enter, which meant that each cup edition had thousands of teams in its initial stages. These teams would go through a number of qualifying rounds before reaching the first round proper, in which they would be paired with top-flight teams.

The cup final was scheduled to coincide with Youth Day, a national holiday celebrated on 25 May and accompanied by the Relay of Youth, which doubled as the official commemoration of Josip Broz Tito's birthday.

First round

Second round

Quarter-finals

Semi-finals

Final

First leg

Second leg

See also
1979–80 Yugoslav First League

External links
1979–80 cup season details at Rec.Sport.Soccer Statistics Foundation
1980 cup final details at Rec.Sport.Soccer Statistics Foundation

Yugoslav Cup seasons
Cup
Yugo